Dent Township may refer to:
 Dent Township, Lawrence County, Arkansas, in Lawrence County, Arkansas
 Dent Township, Woodruff County, Arkansas, in Woodruff County, Arkansas
 Dent Township, Iron County, Missouri

Township name disambiguation pages